Turu Qullu (Aymara turu blunt, qullu mountain,  "blunt mountain", also spelled Turu Kkollu) is a  mountain in the Bolivian Andes. It is located in the Cochabamba Department, Tapacari Province. Turu Qullu lies northwest of Jach'a Ch'utu.

References 

Mountains of Cochabamba Department